Austrogomphus amphiclitus, also known as Austrogomphus (Pleiogomphus) amphiclitus, is a species of dragonfly of the family Gomphidae, 
commonly known as the pale hunter. 
It inhabits streams and rivers in eastern Australia.

Austrogomphus amphiclitus is a medium-sized, black and yellow dragonfly.

Gallery

See also
 List of Odonata species of Australia

References

Gomphidae
Odonata of Australia
Endemic fauna of Australia
Taxa named by Edmond de Sélys Longchamps
Insects described in 1873